Marcian Yakovlevich Germanovich (Russian: Маркиан Яковлевич Германович; October 29, 1895 – September 20, 1937) was a Soviet division commander and Komkor (corps commander). He fought in the Imperial Russian Army in World War I before going over to the Bolsheviks in the subsequent Civil War. He was a recipient of the Order of the Red Banner. During the Great Purge, he was arrested on August 7, 1937 and later executed. After the death of Joseph Stalin, he was rehabilitated in 1957.

Bibliography
 Краснознамённый Киевский. Очерки истории Краснознамённого Киевского военного округа (1919—1979). Издание второе, исправленное и дополненное. Киев, издательство политической литературы Украины, 1979.
 Военный энциклопедический словарь. М., Военное издательство, 1984. С.763-УкрВО;с.838-ЮЗВО.

External links
 Материалы по соединениям РККА

1895 births
1937 deaths
People from Zhabinka District
People from Brestsky Uyezd
Soviet komkors
Russian military personnel of World War I
Soviet military personnel of the Russian Civil War
Recipients of the Order of the Red Banner
Great Purge victims from Belarus
Soviet rehabilitations